Shikha Rajesh Gautam (born 18 April 1998) is an Indian badminton player who represents the country at the International badminton circuit in Women’s Doubles. She has won many National and International Medals. KOA awardee by Government of Karnataka in 2016. A member of the Indian squad at the 2019 Badminton Asia Mixed Team Championships in Hong Kong, Shikha is current National champion and is ranked no. 1 Women's Doubles player in India. Part of Indian National Badminton team. She’s recipient of Ekalavya Award by Government of Karnataka in 2022. 

Currently a member of the Indian squad at the 2023 Badminton Asia Mixed Team Championships in Dubai   

In 2022 she won Bronze medal at BWF Orleans masters super 100. Went on Winning Gold medal at Infosys India International. She also won Silver Medal at 36th National Games at Surat.

Career

A child prodigy, Shikha was born in Visakhapatnam and raised in Nashik before shifting to Bangalore at the age of 13 to train at the Prakash Padukone Badminton Academy. She currently trains at the Yadav Pro Badminton Academy in Bangalore under her coach Jagadish Yadav, former Indian men’s doubles player.

Shikha holds the rare distinction of being the youngest Indian badminton athlete to participate in Junior Badminton Asia Championship. She was only 13 when she represented India at the 2011 Asian Junior Badminton Championships in Lucknow, India. Shikha further represented her country at the Badminton Asia Junior Championships in the year 2012, 2014 and 2016.

Shikha Gautam also competed at the 2016 BWF World Junior Championships in Bilbao, Spain. In the 2016 Premier Badminton League, Shikha was part of the winning Delhi Dashers Team.

In 2017, Shikha won women’s singles title at the Mauritius International and finished runners up at the India International Series held in Hyderabad.	
Until 2017, Shikha was a specialized singles player. It was only at the Senior National Championship in 2017, she realized her potential as a doubles player when she won the Silver medal in women’s doubles at the National Championship held in Patna, Bihar. Following the success, she started playing in Doubles event regularly although singles remained her primary focus. In 2019, at the National Championship in Guwahati, Assam, Shikha entered in women’s doubles event along with her childhood friend Ashwini Bhat as a scratch combination and surprisingly the duo went on to clinch the title. The triumph at the national championship compelled Shikha Gautam to divert her focus to Doubles.

Along with her doubles partner Ashwini Bhat K., Shikha has been consistently ranked number one in India for more than a year now. Shikha, along with Ashwini, won a bronze medal at the 2019 Polish International and the 2019 Maldives International.

Shikha won the Gold medal at the Khelo India Youth Games 2020 and is also a recipient of Karnataka Olympic Award.

• In 2021, Shikha Participated in All England Badminton Championships in Women’s Doubles.

• Went on playing Badminton Asia individual championships in Manila 2022.

• Pre quarter finalists - Debut in BWF World Championships at Tokyo,Japan 2022.

• Shikha Gautam along with her WD partner Ashwini bhat won Silver Medal at 36th National Games at Surat in 2022

Achievements

BWF International Challenge/Series (2 titles, 1 runner-up)
Women's singles

Women's doubles

  BWF International Challenge tournament
  BWF International Series tournament
  BWF Future Series tournament

References

External links
 

Living people
1998 births
Sportspeople from Visakhapatnam
Racket sportspeople from Andhra Pradesh
Sportswomen from Andhra Pradesh
Indian female badminton players